Millions of Cats is a children's picture book written and illustrated by Wanda Gág in 1928. The book won a Newbery Honor award in 1929, one of the few picture books to do so. Millions of Cats is the oldest American picture book still in print.

Plot
The hand-lettered text, done by the author's brother, tells the story of an elderly couple who realize that they are very lonely. The wife wants a cat to love, so her husband sets off in search of a beautiful one to bring home to her. After travelling far away from home, he finds a hillside covered in "cats here, cats there, Cats and kittens everywhere. Hundreds of cats, thousands of cats, Millions and billions and trillions of cats..." This rhythmic phrase is repeated several other times throughout the story.

The man wants to bring home the most beautiful of all the cats, but he is unable to decide. Each seems lovely, so he walks back home with all of the cats following him. His wife is dismayed when he arrives, realizing immediately what her husband overlooked: they won't be able to feed and care for billions and trillions of cats. The wife suggests letting the cats decide which one should stay with them, asking "Which one of you is the prettiest?" This question incites an enormous catfight, frightening the old man and woman, who runs back into the house.

Soon, all is quiet outside. When they venture out, there is no sign of the cats: they'd apparently eaten each other up in their jealous fury. Then, the old man notices one skinny cat hiding in a patch of tall grass. It had survived because it didn't consider itself pretty, so the other cats hadn't attacked it. The couple takes the cat into their home, feed it and bathe it, watching it grow sleek and beautiful as the days pass: exactly the kind of cat they wanted.

Legacy
Wanda Gag pioneered the double-page spread in this book. Writer and reviewer Anita Silvey explained, "She used both pages to move the story forward, putting them together with art that sweeps across the entire page spread: her favorite illustration fell in the center of the book - with the old man carrying cats against the rolling hills." This book remains popular with children, parents, and critics alike. In 1001 Children's Books You Must Read Before You Grow Up, Kaylee Davis calls the book an "enchanting tale", and says "Gag's charming, folk-art style, simple black-and-white illustrations, lyrical language, and catchy refrain that children will happily repeat with each reading, make this a family favorite."

See also

References

Further reading
 Hoyle, Karen (1994). Wanda Gag, Twayne Publishers.
 O'Hara, Megan (2001). The Girlhood Diary of Wanda Gag, 1908–1909: Portrait of a Young Artist. Blue Earth Books.
 Ray, Deborah Kogan (2008). Wanda Gag: The Girl Who Lived to Draw. Viking.

External links
 

1928 children's books
American picture books
Books about cats
Newbery Honor-winning works